Miss World Nicaragua is a beauty pageant in Nicaragua that selects the country's representatives to the Miss World and Mister World, ones of the Big Four international beauty pageants.

Big four representatives beauty pageants

Miss Nicaragua for Miss World 
Note: The current franchise owner started the competition on 2011.
Color key

Mister World

Editions

Minor beauty pageants representatives

Nicaragua in Miss Orb International 
Since 2022 the Miss Mundo Nicaragua selects the delegate of Nicaragua in Miss Orb International.

Miss Continentes Unidos Nicaragua

The Winner of Miss Continentes Unidos Nicaragua goes to Miss Continentes Unidos. After Miss Nicaragua losing the franchise. Sometimes the winner or other candidates will be able to compete at the pageant.

Nicaragua in the Reinado Internacional Del Café 

Since 2011 the Miss Mundo Nicaragua selects the delegate of Nicaragua in The Reinado Internacional Del Café.

Nicaragua in Miss Global Charity Queen International 

Since 2015 the Miss Mundo Nicaragua selects the delegate of Nicaragua in the Miss Global Charity Queen International.

Nicaragua in Face of Beauty International 
Since 2018 the Miss Mundo Nicaragua selects the delegate of Nicaragua in Face of Beauty International.

Nicaragua in Reina Hispanoamericana
In 2006 Nicaragua debuts in the first pageant Reina Hispanoamericana

See also
Miss Nicaragua
Nuestra Belleza Nicaragua

References

External links
Official website

Beauty pageants in Nicaragua
Nicaraguan awards